A tekhnikum is a type of vocational school in the Russian Empire, the Soviet Union, as well as in modern Russia, Ukraine and some other post-Soviet states.

The term was borrowed from 19th-century German education, where these kinds of school were called Technicum.

In modern Russia many tekhnikums were renamed into "technical college", "technological college", "technical liceum", etc.

See also
Professional technical school
Technikum (Polish education)
Technicum (German education)
 Technikon, South Africa

References

Education in Russia
Education in Ukraine
Education in Belarus
Education in Lithuania
School types
Vocational education in the Soviet Union